Wang Dazhong (born 2 March 1935) is a Chinese nuclear reactor engineer who was president of Tsinghua University, and an academician of the Chinese Academy of Sciences.

Biography 
Wang was born in Changli County, Hebei, on 2 March 1935. during the Republic of China. After graduating from Tianjin Nankai High School in 1953, he enrolled in Tsinghua University, where he majored in nuclear reactor. After university, he stayed at the university and worked in the Nuclear Energy Institute. In 1980, he pursued advanced studies in Federal Germany, earning a doctor's degree from RWTH Aachen University in 1982.

He returned to China in October 1982 and continued to work at Tsinghua University as deputy director of the Nuclear Energy Institute. He moved up the ranks to become its president in 1994, a position at vice-ministerial level.

Contributions
Wang participated in the construction of the shielding test reactor "No. 200" with a power of 2000 kW, which is the first nuclear reactor independently designed and built in China. In 1985, he decided to choose the route of shell integrated natural circulation water-cooled reactor and planned to build a 5 MW low-temperature nuclear heating reactor, which is the first integrated natural circulation water-cooled reactor in the world. In 1995, he presided over the construction of "Tsinghua No. 200" 10MW high temperature gas cooled experimental reactor, which is the world's first modular spherical bed high temperature gas cooled reactor and marks that China has mastered the key core technology of modular spherical bed high temperature gas cooled reactor.

Honours and awards 
 1993 Member of the Chinese Academy of Sciences (CAS)
 3 November 2021 Highest Science and Technology Award

References 

1935 births
Living people
Engineers from Hebei
Tsinghua University alumni
RWTH Aachen University alumni
Presidents of Tsinghua University
Members of the Chinese Academy of Sciences